The Semliki Wildlife Reserve is a conservation protected area in the Western Region of Uganda with headquarters at Karugutu in Ntoroko District.

Geography
Semliki Wildlife Reserve is located in Kabarole and Ntoroko districts, in the Toro sub-region, on the floor of the rift valley, where Lake Albert, the Rwenzori Mountains and the Kijura escarpment create backdrops.

History
First established in 1926 by the British colonial Government, the reserve is one of the oldest protected areas in Uganda extending from the Kijura escarpment, north to the River Muzizi and Lake Albert to the low Butuku plains in the West. Since 2005, the area is considered an Lion Conservation Unit.

Flora and fauna 
The dominant vegetation in Semliki is open Acacia-Combretum woodland and grassy savanna, interspersed with patches of Borassus palm forest. There is significant belts of riparian woodland along the main watercourses, and extensive swamps towards Lake Albert. 

Wildlife has partially recovered from the poaching that took a heavy toll during the civil war. The Ugandan kob (Kobus kob) population, which plummeted below 1,000 in the early 1990s, today totals several thousand. More than 1,000 African buffalo are resident, up from about 50 in the early 1990s and elephant and waterbuck numbers are growing too. Leopards are still common, while lions at one point poached to local extinction, are gradually re-colonizing the area. Primates are well represented with black-and-white colobus, olive baboon and red-tailed and vervet monkey all visible in suitable habitats, while a community of perhaps 70 chimpanzees is resident in Mugiri River Forest. The reserve is highly alluring to birdwatchers: some 462 species have been recorded and it is one of the best places in Uganda to see the shoebill.

References

External links

IUCN Directory of Afrotropical Protected Areas

Populated places in Western Region, Uganda
Kabarole District
1929 establishments in Uganda
Albertine Rift montane forests